The Reserve Bank of New Zealand (RBNZ) is the central bank of New Zealand. It was established in 1934 and is currently constituted under the Reserve Bank of New Zealand Act 2021. The governor of the Reserve Bank, currently Adrian Orr, is responsible for New Zealand's currency and operating monetary policy.

The Reserve Bank of New Zealand does not offer financial services to the public nor does it offer deposit insurance, and its website refers people to other financial institutions.

Ownership
The Reserve Bank has been wholly owned by the New Zealand Government since 1936. The Reserve Bank is established by an Act of Parliament (the Reserve Bank of New Zealand Act 2021) and it has statutory independence. The Reserve Bank is accountable to Parliament and provides an annual dividend to the Government.

Monetary policy

Primary Functions
The Reserve Bank's primary function, as defined by the Reserve Bank of New Zealand Act 2021 is to provide "stability in the general level of prices" and "maximum sustainable employment".

The Reserve Bank is responsible for independent management of monetary policy to maintain price stability. The degree of price stability is determined through a Policy Target Agreement with the Minister of Finance. Policy Target Agreements are public documents and hence a government cannot secretly change the targets to gain a short term surge in economic growth.

The mechanism of this is the official cash rate which affects short-term interest rates. The Bank will provide cash overnight at 0.50% above the cash rate to banks against good security with no limit. Furthermore, the Bank will accept deposits from financial institutions with interest usually at the official cash rate.

Banks that offer loans at interest higher than the official cash rate will be undercut by banks that offer cheaper loans, and banks that loan out lower than the official cash rate will make less compared to other banks which can simply deposit their money in the Reserve Bank with a higher rate of return. The Reserve Bank borrows and offers loans with no limit on volumes in order to ensure that the interest rate in the market remains at the official cash rate level.

Through controlling this, the Reserve Bank can then influence short term demand in the New Zealand Economy and use this to control prices.

Adjustments to the official cash rate are made eight times a year. It can make unscheduled adjustments but does not usually do so.

Fractional-reserve banking
Like all modern monetary systems, the monetary system in New Zealand is based on fiat and fractional-reserve banking. In a fractional-reserve banking system, the largest portion of money created is not created by the Reserve Bank itself. Private sector commercial banks create 80% or more.

Issuing of currency
The Bank by virtue of the Reserve Bank Act has the sole right of issuing New Zealand legal tender notes and coins. The Reserve Bank controls the issuing of currency to banks and also replaces used and damaged money from circulation. In March 2005, the Bank decided to remove the 5 cent coin from circulation (the following year), as well as reducing the size of 10, 20 and 50 cent coins.

The Reserve Bank accepts all New Zealand currency for payment at face value. This applies to all demonetised or withdrawn currency, however such currency need not be accepted by money changers as it is no longer legal tender. All decimal notes are legal tender except $1 and $2 notes as these have been withdrawn.
Damaged notes are still worth something so long as they are recognisable. The Reserve Bank website notes that as a rule of thumb if there is more than half a bank note they will pay its full value. To receive payment people have to turn in the note to either the Reserve Bank in Wellington or any bank.

Collectors coins
The Reserve Bank from time to time produces limited runs of legal tender coins for collectors and have a New Zealand theme and design. These coins generally do not circulate, but are legal tender. The coins are sold for the Reserve Bank via New Zealand Post's business unit.

Supervision of the banking system
The Reserve Bank also acts to supervise the New Zealand banking system to ensure that the system remains healthy, however it does not guarantee that a bank will not fail, or face problems.

 there are 26 registered banks.

All registered banks operating in New Zealand must issue a quarterly disclosure statement, and the Reserve Bank supervises these.

The purpose of these disclosure statements is to:
 Assist depositors to make sound decisions
 Encourage banks to maintain sound banking practices

The summary comprises:
 A key information summary that provides a brief overview of the bank's financial condition
 General disclosure statement to provide comprehensive information on the bank
 Supplemental disclosure statement

More information, see list of registered banks at the RBNZ website.

Regulation of non-bank deposit takers (NBDTs)
Under Part 5D of the Reserve Bank of New Zealand Act 1989 (the "Act"), the RBNZ is charged with the enforcement of the credit rating and prudential requirements applying to non-bank deposit takers (NBDTs) in New Zealand. These functions were introduced by the enactment of the Reserve Bank of New Zealand Amendment Act 2008. Further amendments to Act have been foreshadowed to complete the regulatory framework for the NBDT sector.

Prudential supervision of the insurance industry
Under section 12 of the Insurance (Prudential Supervision) Act 2010, the RBNZ is charged with the prudential supervision of the New Zealand insurance industry. This includes the licensing of persons to carry on insurance business in New Zealand.

History
The Reserve Bank of New Zealand was established from 1 August 1934 by the Reserve Bank of New Zealand Act 1933. The Reserve Bank first issued banknotes in 1934, see New Zealand pound.

Governors

The following have served as governors of the Reserve Bank:
 Leslie Lefeaux (1 January 1934 – 31 December 1940)
 William Fox Longley Ward (Acting Governor: 1 May 1941 – 1 February 1944), (1 February 1944 – 8 July 1948)
 Edward Coldham Fussell (21 July 1948 – 20 July 1962)
 Gilbert Wilson (21 July 1962 – 20 July 1967)
 Sir Alan Low (21 July 1967 – 11 February 1977)
 Raymond W. R. White (12 February 1977 – 11 February 1982)
 Dick L. Wilks (12 February 1982 – 17 May 1984)
 Sir Spencer Russell (18 May 1984 – 31 August 1988)
 Dr Donald Brash (1 September 1988 – 26 April 2002)
 Dr Alan Bollard (23 September 2002 – 25 September 2012)
 Graeme Wheeler (26 September 2012 – 27 September 2017)
 Grant Spencer (Acting Governor: October 2017 - March 2018)
 Adrian Orr (27 March 2018 – present)

Museum

The Reserve Bank Museum, based at the Bank's headquarters in Wellington Central, has been open to the public since 2006.

Coat of arms

See also
New Zealand dollar
Banks in New Zealand

References

External links

 
 List of registered banks in New Zealand
 Overview of the role, structure and governance arrangements of the Reserve Bank
 Reserve Bank of New Zealand, Who They Are

Banks of New Zealand
Banking in New Zealand
New Zealand
Government agencies of New Zealand
Economy of New Zealand
Financial regulatory authorities of New Zealand
Banks established in 1934
1934 establishments in New Zealand